Joseph George Kakunda is a Tanzanian politician and a member of the Chama Cha Mapinduzi political party. He is an incumbent Member of Parliament representing Sikonge Constituency in Tabora Region, since 2015, currently serving his second term (2020-2025). He was Minister of Industry and Trade from November 10, 2018 to June 8 2019. This was after serving as Deputy Minister in the President's Office, Regional Administration and Local Government from October 10 2017 to November 10 2018. Before joining politics in 2015, He amassed vast experience in working as a Local Government Officer (1996-2000), excelling from Economist II to Principal Economist and Director of Water Program Coordination in the Central Government (2000-2015), and Community Development Coordinator for the UNDP (Mbola Millennium Village Project) in Tabora, Tanzania (2006-2007).

References

1968 births
Living people
Chama Cha Mapinduzi politicians

Tanzanian MPs 2015–2020